Cáqueza is a municipality and town of Colombia in the department of Cundinamarca. The municipality borders Fosca in the south, Ubaque in the north, Une and Chipaque in the west and Quetame in the east.

Etymology 
The name Cáqueza comes from Chibcha and means "Region or enclosure without forest".

History 
The area of Cáqueza in the times before the Spanish conquest was inhabited by the Muisca and Cáqueza was ruled by the zipa based in Bacatá.

Modern Cáqueza was founded on October 23, 1600 by Luis Enríquez.

Economy 
Main economic activities in Cáqueza are agriculture and livestock farming. Important agricultural products are beans, maize, peas and onions.

Born in Cáqueza 
 Daniel Alejandro Torres, Colombian footballer

Gallery

References 

Municipalities of Cundinamarca Department
Populated places established in 1600
1600 establishments in the Spanish Empire
Muisca Confederation
Muysccubun